Claxby and Usselby railway station was a station that served the hamlets of Claxby and Usselby in Lincolnshire, England. It was opened in 1848 on a branch line of the Great Grimsby and Sheffield Junction Railway to Market Rasen but closed in 1960.

References

Disused railway stations in Lincolnshire
Railway stations in Great Britain opened in 1848
Railway stations in Great Britain closed in 1960
Former Great Central Railway stations